Mihail Formuzal (born 7 November 1959) is a Moldovan politician of Gagauz ethnicity, who was Governor (Başkan) of the Autonomous Territorial Unit of Gagauzia (Gagauz Yeri) from December 2006 to March 2015.

Biography
Mihail Formuzal was born on 7 November 1959 in Beșghioz, Ceadîr-Lunga District (now Gagauzia), Moldovan SSR, USSR, in a large family of peasants. After graduating from elementary schools (1966-1977) of his native village, in 1977 he was enrolled in the military service, within the USSR's military-maritime fleet.

In 1979, he joined the "M.V. Frunze" Upper Artillery Military School in the Odessa (Ukrainian SSR) and graduated it in 1983. He then worked for the USSR's armed forces in various leading positions and in the November 1994, he resigned having the  military rank of major.

In 1995 Formuzal became Deputy Mayor of Ceadîr-Lunga city, Gagauzia. Between 1995-1998 he studied at Academy of Public Administration of the Government of Republic of Moldova. 

In 1995 he was elected deputy mayor, and in 1999 Formuzal was elected as Mayor of Ceadîr-Lunga, later in 2003 being re-elected.

Mihail Formuzal has run for the early elections for the Gagauz autonomy governor on October 6, 2002, but because of low turnout (of only 41.43% of voters) the elections were invalidated. He participated in a new round of elections on 20 October 2002.  In this elections, Gheorghe Tabunşcic won 50.99% of the votes, being elected as a Governor , and Mihail Formuzal obtained 43.22% of the votes.

Shortly, after Formuzal became the main rival of the PCRM’s (Communist Party of the Republic of Moldova) candidate at the governor's election in 2002, a series of persecutions were initiated against Formuzal, 8 criminal cases for alleged economic crimes (corruption), committed as mayor of Ceadîr-Lunga were opened. He rejected the accusations as politically motivated. 

In 2005, he became a member of the Republican Popular Party, and then, elected as a president of the Republican Council of the Party. He is the leader of the "Gagauzia Unita" Public Movement, a promoter of the most vehement and acute criticism addressed to the Communists Party of the Republic of Moldova and President Voronin. The Republican Popular Party has accused the government of  the Republic of Moldova of that time for usurping the state power.

Mihail Formuzal is married and has three children.

Elections of December 3, 2006
On December 3, 2006, the new elections were held for Governor's post of Autonomous Territorial Unit of Gagauzia. These were due to the expiring  of the four-year mandate of the Governor Gheorghe Tabunşcic.
In the electoral race for the Governor position there were registered four independent candidates: Gheorghe Tabunşcic, the actual Governor, Alexandru Stoianoglo, the Deputy General Prosecutor of the Republic of Moldova, Nicolai Dudoglo, the  Mayor of Comrat, and Mihail Formuzal, the Mayor of Ceadâr-Lunga.

In this election, Formuzal was supported by the pro-Russia parties alliance such as Ravnopravie-Patria Rodina. In the election campaign, Formuzal pledged to open commercial, economic and cultural representations of Gagauzia in Turkey, Russia, Bulgaria and Ukraine and to implement a project called "Bringing home the compatriots", targeting the Gagauz citizens who work abroad.
Formuzal insisted to stipulate in the Constitution the Gagauzia's right to self-determination if the Republic of Moldova would in some way lose its status as a subject of international law.

It was a mistake that the Parliament from the Chisinau did not introduce in the Constitution the article that would provide the right for self-determination to Gagauzia in case of loss of sovereignty by the Republic of Moldova", Mihail Formuzal told to the BBC Radio. 

In the first round of elections, on December 3, 2006, Mihail Formuzal and Nicolai Dudoglo accumulated 33.89% and 31.40% respectively of votes. At the second round  held on  December 17, 2006, the mayor of Ceadir-Lunga, Mihail Formuzal, won the election and  became the bashkan (governor of Gagauzia with 56.23% of the votes.

Governor of Gagauzia
On December 19, 2006, Mihail Formuzal, the elected Governor of Gagauzia, said that he intends to work constructively with the central authorities from Chișinău, which have been criticized several times during the campaign. Formuzal also mentioned that he will not criticize or blame his predecessors, but will end all the projects started during their mandate.

According to the legislation in force, after the announcement of the final official results by the Central Electoral Committee of Gagauzia, the mandate of the new Governor must be validated by the Comrat Court of Appeal. Subsequently, by presidential decree, the new Governor must be appointed as a member of the Government. Therefore, after almost four years of absence, a representative of the opposition has appeared in the Cabinet, even if he did not have a portfolio.

After his term as Governor of Gagauzia finished, Formuzal emigrated to Germany, where he currently resides.

References

External links
 BBC, 18 decembrie 2006 - Mihail Formuzal câștigă alegerile de bașcan în Găgăuzia
 Jurnalul de Chișinău, 16 aprilie 2004 - Mihail Formuzal: “Comuniștii nu vor ceda puterea pe cale democratică”
 Adept, 19 octombrie 2005 - Declarația Partidului Popular Republican cu privire la așa-numitul "caz Mihail Formuzal"

1959 births
Gagauz people
Living people
Political office-holders in Moldova
People from Gagauzia
Mayors of places in Moldova
Moldovan emigrants to Germany